Karl Gustaf Inge Danielsson (14 June 1941 – 30 June 2021) was a Swedish footballer who played as a forward. He played for Ifö/Bromölla IF, Helsingborgs IF, AFC Ajax and IFK Norrköping. Danielsson also won 17 caps for the Sweden national team, scoring 8 goals.

Club career
Danielson signed to play with Helsingborgs IF in the Allsvenskan in 1967. In 1968, Danielsson signed on to play professionally with AFC Ajax and he became a large part of the club's third straight league title. Danielsson came at the end of the season and managed to score nine goals. Danielsson also played in the 1969 European Cup Final against fellow Swede Kurt Hamrin's AC Milan, losing 4–1.

Danielsson scored several important goals both in the Dutch league and the European Cups, but after a little more than a year returned to Helsingborgs, playing in the lower Swedish divisions. In 1973, he swapped clubs to IFK Norrköping where he spent another year in the highest Swedish division before ending his career where it started, with Ifö/Bromölla IF.

International career 
Danielsson made his debut for the Sweden national team during his time in Ifö/Bromölla IF who then played in the Swedish second division. The debut came against Denmark at Råsunda stadium, 6 November 1966 where Danielsson scored the game-winning goal (2–1).

He is most known for scoring two goals against Portugal in November 1966, in the European Championship qualifier.

Personal life 
After ending his football career he ran a flooring business until his retirement.

Honours
Ajax
 Eredivisie: 1967–68
 European Cup runners-up: 1968–69

References

1941 births
2021 deaths
Swedish footballers
Association football forwards
Ifö Bromölla IF players
Helsingborgs IF players
AFC Ajax players
IFK Norrköping players
Sweden international footballers
Allsvenskan players
Eredivisie players
Expatriate footballers in the Netherlands
Swedish expatriate footballers
Swedish expatriate sportspeople in the Netherlands
People from Bromölla Municipality
Footballers from Skåne County